Queen's Young Leader Award was an annual award given in recognition of leadership skills by young persons between the ages of 18 and 29. The award was open to selected Commonwealth of Nations to recognize exceptional people or organizations who are making a difference in improving other citizen's lives. The program was established by the Queen Elizabeth Diamond Jubilee Trust, in partnership with Comic Relief and the Royal Commonwealth Society. The programme closed in 2019.

History
The award was first established in 2014 and initially was approved to run through 2018. Nominations re-opened each June.

Award recipients by year

2014

Kate Row of Australia
Emily Smith of Australia
Alicia Wallace of Bahamas
Shamir Shehab of Bangladesh
Donnya Piggott of Barbados
Denielle Neal of Belize
Khairunnisa Ash'ari of Brunei Darussalam
Alain Nteff of Cameroon
Mallah Enow Tabot of Cameroon
Joannes Paulus Yimbesalu of Cameroon
Melissa Kargiannakis of Canada
Aaron Joshua Pinto of Canada
Rosimay Venancio of Canada
Kellyn George of Dominica
Alzima Elisha Bano of Fiji
Leroy Phillips of Guyana
Ashwini Angadi of India
Akshay Jadhao of India
Devika Malik of India
Jerome Cowans of Jamaica
Nicole Nation of Jamaica
Abdikadir Aden Hassan of Kenya
Samuel Karuita of Kenya
Caren Nelima Odanga of Kenya
Mohammad Yaaseen Edoo of Mauritius
Barkha Mossae of Mauritius
Karuna Rana of Mauritius
Tanyaradzwa Daringo of Namibia
Tabitha Besley of New Zealand
Oladipupo Ajiroba of Nigeria
Nkechikwu Azinge of Nigeria
Kelvin Ogholi of Nigeria
Isaiah Owolabi of Nigeria
Salman Ahmad of Pakistan
Christina J K Giwe of Papua New Guinea
John Taka of Papua New Guinea
Nadia Hitimana of Rwanda
Jean D’Amour Mutoni of Rwanda
Javon Liburd of Saint Kitts and Nevis
Kenville Horne of Saint Vincent and the Grenadines
Erna Takazawa of Samoa
Philip Cole of Sierra Leone
Christina Houaisuta Solomon Islands
Nosipho Bele of South Africa
Emma Dicks of South Africa
Patrice Madurai of South Africa
Thejitha Saubhagya Edirisinghe of Sri Lanka
Kavindya Thennakoon of Sri Lanka
Nondumiso Hlophe of Swaziland
Given Edward of Tanzania
Angela Benedicto Mnagoza of Tanzania
Teocah Dove of Trinidad And Tobago
Diana Nakaweesa of Uganda
Deo Sekandi of Uganda
Nicola Byrom of United Kingdom
Zoe Jackson of United Kingdom
Edmund Page of United Kingdom
Missack Willy of Vanuatu
Brighton Kaoma of Zambia
Regina Mtonga of Zambia

2015

Africa
Alain Nteff of Cameroon
Joannes Paulus Yimbesalu of Cameroon
Mallah Enow Tabot of Cameroon
Abdikadir Aden Hassan
Caren Nelima Odanga
Samuel Karuita
Barkha Mossae
Karuna Rana
Mohammad Yaaseen Edoo
Tanyaradzwa Daringo
Isaiah Owolabi
Kelvin Ogholi
Nkechikwu Azinge
Oladipupo Ajiroba of Nigeria
Jean d’Amour Mutoni
Nadia Hitimana
Philip Cole
Emma Dicks
Nosipho Bele
Patrice Madurai
Nondumiso Hlophe
Angela Benedicto Mnagoza
Given Edward
Deo Sekandi
Diana Nakaweesa
Brighton Kaoma
Regina Mtonga

Asia
Shamir Shehab
Khairunnisa Ash’ari
Akshay Jadhao
Ashwini Angadi
Devika Malik
Salman Ahmad
Kavindya Thennakoon
Thejitha Saubhagya Edirisinghe

Caribbean and Americas 
Alicia Wallace
Donnya Piggott
Denielle Neal
Aaron Joshua Pinto
Melissa Kargiannakis
Rosimay Venancio
Kellyn George
Leroy Phillips
Jerome Cowans
Nicole Nation
Javon Liburd
Kenville Horne
Teocah Dove

Europe
Edmund Page
Nicola Byrom
Zoe Jackson

Pacific
Emily Smith
Kate Row
Alzima Elisha Bano
Tabitha Besley
Christina Giwe
John Taka
Erna Takazawa
Christina Houaisuta
Willy Missack

2016

Africa
Moitshepi Matsheng
David Morfaw
Paul-Miki Akpablie
Alex Mativo of Kenya
Peris Bosire of Kenya
Susan Mueni Waita of Kenya
Maletsabisa Molapo
Asante Mzungu of Malawi
Madalo Banda of Malawi
Deegesh Maywah
Drucila Meireles
Imrana Alhaji Buba of Nigeria
Olanrewaju Adeloye of Nigeria
Olumide Makanjuola of Nigeria
Nancy Sibo Rwanda
Angelique Pouponneau
Howard Nelson-Williams
Jessica Dewhurst of South Africa
Lethabo Ashleigh Letube of South Africa
Rachel Nungu of Tanzania
Josephine Nabukenya of Uganda

Asia
Osama Bin Noor
Kartik Sawhney
Neha Swain
Calvin Yoong Shen Woo
Safaath Ahmed Zahir
Muhammad Usman Khan
Zainab Bibi
Mark Jin Quan Cheng
Nushelle de Silva

Caribbean and Americas
Regis Burton
Firhaana Bulbulia
Shamelle Rice
Deidra Smith
Gunjan Mhapankar
Kelly Lovell
Tina Alfred
Ali Dowden
Tijani Christian
Tevin Shepherd
Trevis Belle
Dillon Ollivierre

Europe
Katerina Gavrielidou
Annabelle Xerri
Sara Ezabe Malliue
Adam Bradford
Ashleigh Porter-Exley
Ella Mckenzie

Pacific
Alexander Stonyer-Dubinovsky of Australia
Jacob Thomas of Australia
Luisa Tuilau of Fiji
Tabotabo Auatabu of Kiribati
Unique Harris of Nauru
Brad Olsen of New Zealand
Valentino Wichman of New Zealand
Seini Fisi’ihoi of Papua New Guinea
Nolan Salmon Parairua of Solomon Islands
Aiona Prescott of Tonga
Easter Tekafa Niko of Tonga
Mary Siro of Solomon Islands

2017

Africa
Chaikhwa Lobatse
Tobby Bond Njamngang
Efua Asibon
Elijah Amoo Addo of Ghana
Winnifred Selby
Chebet Lesan
Domtila Chesang
Towett Ngetich
Virginia Khunguni
Hilda Nambili Liswani
Nyeuvo Amukushu
Bukola Bolarinwa
Nasir Yammama of Nigeria
Kellya Uwiragiye
Yvette Ishimwe
Demien Mougal
Kumba Musa
Salton Massally
Aditi Lachman
Chantelle De Abreu of South Africa
Farai Mubaiwa
Nonduduzo Ndlovu
Favourite Driciru
Joel Baraka
Ruth Nabembezi
Alina Karimamusama
Natasha Salifyanji Kaoma

Asia
Rahat Hossain
Sajid Iqbal
Ankit Kawatra
Suhani Jalota
Heidy Quah
Syed Faizan Hussain
Yunquan Qin
Rakitha Malewana
Senel Wanniarachchi
Yeoh Hong Boon

Caribbean and Americas
Lia Kupiec Nicholson
Jamilla Sealy
Alexander Deans
Kevin Vuong
Eber Ravariere
Rianna Patterson
Michael Thomas
Samantha Sheoprashad
Abrahim Simmonds
Ajani Lebourne
Dion Browne
Matthew Batson
Siddel Ramkissoon

Europe

Eman Borg
Vladyslava Kravchenko
Alex Holmes
Usman Ali

Pacific
Abdullahi Alim
Jordan O’Reilly
Madeleine Buchner
Ashleigh Smith
Johnetta Lili
Theresa Gizoria
Karrie Jionisi
Elizabeth Kite

2018

Africa
Alimatu Bawah Wiabriga of Ghana
Derick Omari of Ghana
Shadrack Frimpong of Ghana
Douglas Mwangi of Kenya
Reekelitsoe Molapo of Lesotho
Chikondi Violet Mlozi of Malawi
Pilirani Khoza of Malawi
Mavis Elias of Namibia
Hauwa Ojeifo of Nigeria
Isaac Ezirim of Nigeria
Kennedy Ekezie-Joseph of Nigeria
Priscilla Ruzibuka of Rwanda
Anael Bodwell of Seychelles
Brima Manso Bangura of Sierra Leone
Siposetu Sethu Mbuli of South Africa
Thamsanqa Hoza of South Africa
Alice Ahadi Magaka of Tanzania
Isaya Yunge of Tanzania
Bazil Mwotta Biddemu of Uganda
Elizabeth Kasujja of Uganda
Stephen Katende of Uganda
Gift Chansa of Zambia
Sela Kasepa of Zambia

Asia
Ayman Sadiq of Bangladesh
Zaiba Tahyya of Bangladesh
Ahmad Fadillah Sellahhuddin of Brunei Darussalam
Aditya Kulkarni of India
Deane De Menezes of India
Trisha Shetty of India
Siva Nagappan Visvesvaran of Malaysia
Wen Shin Chia of Malaysia
Haroon Yasin of Pakistan
Hassan Mujtaba Zaidi of Pakistan
Mahnoor Syed of Pakistan
Efraheem Matthew of Pakistan
Tian Sern Oon of Singapore
Yi Jun Mock of Singapore
Bhagya Wijayawardane of Sri Lanka

Caribbean and Americas
Ronelle King of Barbados
Aditya Mohan of Canada
Ishita Aggarwal of Canada
Midia Shikh Hassan of Canada
Lakeyia Joseph of Dominica
Jenella Edwards of Grenada
Marva Langevine of Guyana
Aubrey Stewart of Jamaica
Jodie Dennie of St. Vincent and Grenadines
Benedict Bryan of Trinidad and Tobago
Jean-Claude Cournand of Trinidad and Tobago

Europe
Antonia Michailidi of Cyprus
Martina Caruana of Malta
Harry Phinda of United Kingdom
Leanne Armitage of United Kingdom

Pacific
Caitlin Figueiredo of Australia
Hunter Johnson of Australia
Lily Brechtefeld Kumkee of Kiribati
Alexia Hilbertidou of New Zealand
Ezekiel Raui of New Zealand
Petronilla Molioo Mataeliga of Samoa
Millicent Barty of Solomon Islands
Joshua Isikeli Sefesi of Tonga
Litiana Kalsrap of Vanuatu

References

External links
 Queen’s Young Leader Award

Annual events in the United Kingdom
Awards established in 2014
Commonwealth of Nations awards
 
Leadership
2014 establishments in the United Kingdom